The Scientific Cardplayer, also known as The Scopone Game, is a 1973 Italian comedy-drama film directed by Luigi Comencini. The screenplay was written by Rodolfo Sonego.

Plot
An aging and wealthy American woman journeys to Rome each year with her chauffeur George to play the card game scopone with destitute Peppino and his wife Antonia. The annual scenario remains unchanged: she donates the initial stakes, then ultimately wins the game, shattering the couple's dream of scoring a victory and improving their lot in life. Eventually their daughter Cleopatra seeks revenge on her parents' behalf.

Production notes
Bette Davis was in the midst of a three-week vacation at the La Costa health spa in Carlsbad, California when she received the script. On 24-hour notice, she flew to Rome for filming, but did not learn that the dialogue was to be recorded in Italian until the first day of shooting.

This was the third on-screen pairing of Davis and Joseph Cotten. They had previously costarred in Beyond the Forest (1949) and Hush...Hush, Sweet Charlotte (1964).

Cast
 Bette Davis as The Millionairess
 Joseph Cotten as George
 Alberto Sordi as Peppino
 Silvana Mangano as Antonia
 Antonella Demaggi as Cleopatra
 Mario Carotenuto as The Professor
 Domenico Modugno as Righetto

Production credits
 Produced by Dino De Laurentiis
 Original music by Piero Piccioni
 Cinematography by Giuseppe Ruzzolini
 Art direction by Luigi Scaccianoce
 Costume design by Bruna Parmesan

Awards
 1973 David di Donatello Award for Best Actor (Alberto Sordi, winner)
 1973 David di Donatello Award for Best Actress (Silvana Mangano, winner)
 1973 Italian National Syndicate of Film Journalists Nastro d'Argento for Best Supporting Actor (Mario Carotenuto, winner)

See also
Lo scopone scientifico at Italian Wikipedia

References

External links

1973 films
Italian comedy-drama films
Films set in Italy
1973 drama films
1970s Italian-language films
Films about gambling
Films directed by Luigi Comencini
Films set in Rome
Films shot in Rome
Films scored by Piero Piccioni
1970s Italian films